Heukelom is a hamlet in the Dutch province of Limburg. It is located in the municipality of Bergen, about 2 km south of the village of Afferden.

Heukelom is not a statistical entity, and the postal authorities have placed it under Afferden. Heukelom has one monument, the St Antonius Chapel which dates from the 17th century.

References

Populated places in Limburg (Netherlands)
Bergen, Limburg